FC "Leningradets" Gatchina is a Russian football team from Gatchina. 

It played professionally from 1992 to 1997. Their best result was 7th place in Zone 3 of the Russian Second Division in 1992. In 2015 was reestablished and since 2018 compete in the Russian Third League. In 2019 became a farm club for FC Leningradets.

Team name history
 1992: FC Aleks Gatchina
 1993–1997, 2015-2019: FC Gatchina
 2019–: S.Sh. Leningradets Gatchina

External links
 
  Team history at KLISF

Association football clubs established in 1992
Association football clubs established in 2015
Association football clubs disestablished in 1997
Defunct football clubs in Russia
Sport in Leningrad Oblast
1992 establishments in Russia
1997 disestablishments in Russia